Muhammed Salihu Audu better known as Muhammed S. Audu is a Nigerian academic. He served as the sixth Vice-Chancellor of Federal University of Technology, Minna from 2007 to 2012. He is currently the Deputy Vice-Chancellor of Federal University, Lokoja.

References 

Vice-Chancellors of Federal University of Technology, Minna
Living people
Nigerian academics
Year of birth missing (living people)